DIMP or dIMP may refer to:

 Diisopropyl methylphosphonate, a chemical byproduct in the production of sarin gas
 DIMP (antiandrogen) (N-(3,5-dimethyl-4-isoxazolylmethyl)phthalimide), a nonsteroidal antiandrogen
 Deoxyinosine monophosphate (dIMP)